Kaizō Chōjin Shubibinman 3: Ikai no Princess (改造町人シュビビンマン3 －異界のプリンセス－ Restructuring Super Human Shubibinman 3: The Princess of the Alien World) is an action game developed and published by Masaya for the PC Engine CD-ROM² in 1992 only in Japan. It is a sequel to Kaizō Chōjin Shubibinman 2: Aratanaru Teki.

Gameplay
The game is a 2D side scrolling action game.

Plot
The game follows several heroic characters.

Release 
In 2016, it received a re-release through Project Egg.

Reception
Japanese gaming magazine Famitsu gave it a 21 out of 30 score on release. In a retrospective review in 2014, Retro Gamer highlighted it as one of the most memorable games about Japanese warriors, opining it "is arguably the best looking" in the series and "spectacular bosses and set pieces complement its demanding swordplay." 

On the other hand, German magazine Video Games rated it only a 2/5 upon the release, opining the players "should not be fooled" by the game's visuals as it is unplayable as the "most chaotic action title ever."

References

External links

1992 video games
Hack and slash games
Japan-exclusive video games
Multiplayer and single-player video games
Science fiction video games
Side-scrolling platform games
TurboGrafx-CD games
TurboGrafx-CD-only games
Video games developed in Japan
Video games featuring female protagonists